Great Asby Scar is a Site of Special Scientific Interest (SSSI) and National Nature Reserve in Cumbria, UK. It is an area of limestone pavement, south of the village of Great Asby.

History
A "scar" is the local name for a limestone pavement⁠—an area of limestone rock which has been eroded by an overlying ice sheet during the Last Glacial Maximum and then fissured by rain to form a flat rocky pattern which resembles man-made pavement. Many limestone pavements in the UK have been exploited by quarrying but this example is comparatively extensive and unspoilt.

Great Asby Scar is in the centre of this region. Other scars include Orton Scar, Grange Scar, and Little Asby Scar.

Site location and designation
It is in the Orton Fells in the district of Eden, near the village of Great Asby.

A walled settlement was constructed on a small plateau, covering an area of about 1.25 acres. This is known as Castle Folds and, as it dates back to Roman times, is protected as a scheduled monument.

Flora
The region has been described as a matrix of both acidic and alkaline grassland, dominated by blue moor-grass and matgrass. Various other species have been known to exist in this region, including rare species of buckler ferns and limestone ferns. As the area is quite exposed, the vegetation tends to grow in the crevices between the limestone blocks which are known as grykes. Notable species include autumn gentian, helleborines and Solomon's Seal.

Fauna
The area is quite bleak and barren. The most notable creature is a rare snail, Vitrea subrimata.

References

External links

Limestone formations of the United Kingdom
National nature reserves in England
Nature reserves in Cumbria
Sites of Special Scientific Interest in Cumbria
Eden District